Gryllita is a genus of cricket in the subfamily Gryllinae. There are at least two described species in Gryllita.

Species
These two species belong to the genus Gryllita:
 Gryllita arizonae Hebard, 1935 i c g b (Arizona cricket)
 Gryllita weissmani Vickery, 1993 c g
Data sources: i = ITIS, c = Catalogue of Life, g = GBIF, b = Bugguide.net

References

Further reading

 
 
 

Gryllinae
Articles created by Qbugbot
Orthoptera genera